In number theory, an extravagant number (also known as a wasteful number) is a natural number in a given number base that has fewer digits than the number of digits in its prime factorization in the given number base (including exponents). For example, in base 10, 4 = 22, 6 = 2×3, 8 = 23, and 9 = 32 are extravagant numbers .

There are infinitely many extravagant numbers in every base.

Mathematical definition
Let  be a number base, and let  be the number of digits in a natural number  for base . A natural number  has the prime factorisation
 

See also 
Equidigital number
Frugal number

Notes

References 
 R.G.E. Pinch (1998), Economical Numbers.
 Chris Caldwell, The Prime Glossary: extravagant number at The Prime Pages.

Base-dependent integer sequences